Blue Water Empire is a three-part Australian dramatised-documentary series aired on ABC TV in 2019, which gives an insight into the history of the Torres Strait Islands. The series features the history of the islands from the pre-colonial era through to contemporary times. It is centred on key stories told by the men and women of the region, brought to life by dramatic re-enactments.

It was produced by Aaron Fa'aoso's film production company, Lonestar Productions.

Cast 
 Ryan Corr
 Damian Walshe-Howling
 Aaron Fa'aoso
 Jimi Bani
 Roy Billing
 Geoff Morrell
 Jeremy Lindsay Taylor
 Peter Phelps
 Merwez Whaleboat
 Robert Mammone
 Damian De Montemas

References

2019 Australian television series debuts
2019 Australian television series endings